The women's 100 metre backstroke competition of the 2014 FINA World Swimming Championships (25 m) was held on 3 December with the heats and the semifinals and 4 December with the final.

Records
Prior to the competition, the existing world and championship records were as follows.

The following records were established during the competition:

Results

Heats
The heats were held at 11:28.

Semifinals
The semifinals were held at 18:44.

Semifinal 1

Semifinal 2

Final
The final was held at 19:00.

References

Women's 100 metre backstroke
2014 in women's swimming